Francesco Rizzo da Santacroce, also known as simply Francesco da Santacroce or Francesco di Bernardo de' Vecchi Da Santa Croce (active 1507 – 1545) was an Italian painter of the Renaissance period, active mainly in Bergamo and Venice.

Biography
He initially trained with Francesco di Simone da Santacroce, an ultimately inherited this master's studio. He was later a pupil or influenced by Giovanni Bellini or Vittore Carpaccio. He was born in the Sestiere of Santa Croce in Venice, or his family came from the hamlet of Santa Croce in Bergamo.

In 1507, he painted an Altarpiece depicting St Peter for the parish church of Lerina. By 1519, he was working in Venice, where he painted for San Cristoforo, the church of the Dominicans in the Zattere, San Francesco della Vigna (Last Supper), and Santa Maria degli Angeli, Murano (Virgin and St Jerome and Jermiah'' moved to San Pietro). He also painted an altarpiece for the parish church of Chirignago.

Girolamo and Pietro Paolo Rizzo were also painters and part of the same family.

References

16th-century Italian painters
Italian male painters
Italian Renaissance painters
Painters from Bergamo
1540s deaths
Year of birth unknown